Ribes contumazensis is a species of currant, named after Peruvian botanist Isidoro Sánchez Vega of Cajamarca. It is completely glabrous apart from the stalked glands, differentiating it from R. colandina (same region).

Description
Its adaxial surface is subglabrous, eglandular, while the abaxial surface has scattered stalked glands especially on its primary and secondary veins. Flowers are narrowly cyathiform and a brownish yellow colour, covered with scattered glandular trichomes.

Distribution
Cajamarca Department.

References

External links
NGBR Herbarium Specimen

contumazensis
Flora of Peru
Dioecious plants